Hucisko may refer to the following places:
Hucisko, Bełchatów County in Łódź Voivodeship (central Poland)
Hucisko, Radomsko County in Łódź Voivodeship (central Poland)
Hucisko, Lublin Voivodeship (east Poland)
Hucisko, Wieliczka County in Lesser Poland Voivodeship (south Poland)
Hucisko, Gmina Bodzentyn in Świętokrzyskie Voivodeship (south-central Poland)
Hucisko, Kolbuszowa County in Subcarpathian Voivodeship (south-east Poland)
Hucisko, Gmina Nowa Słupia in Świętokrzyskie Voivodeship (south-central Poland)
Hucisko, Gmina Strawczyn in Świętokrzyskie Voivodeship (south-central Poland)
Hucisko, Leżajsk County in Subcarpathian Voivodeship (south-east Poland)
Hucisko, Gmina Ruda Maleniecka in Świętokrzyskie Voivodeship (south-central Poland)
Hucisko, Gmina Słupia Konecka in Świętokrzyskie Voivodeship (south-central Poland)
Hucisko, Gmina Stąporków in Świętokrzyskie Voivodeship (south-central Poland)
Hucisko, Nisko County in Subcarpathian Voivodeship (south-east Poland)
Hucisko, Rzeszów County in Subcarpathian Voivodeship (south-east Poland)
Hucisko, Sucha County in Lesser Poland Voivodeship (south Poland)
Hucisko, Przysucha County in Masovian Voivodeship (east-central Poland)
Hucisko, Szydłowiec County in Masovian Voivodeship (east-central Poland)
Hucisko, Częstochowa County in Silesian Voivodeship (south Poland)
Hucisko, Lubliniec County in Silesian Voivodeship (south Poland)
Hucisko, Zawiercie County in Silesian Voivodeship (south Poland)